Warden Lake is a reservoir on Moores Run (a Cacapon River tributary) near Wardensville in northern Hardy County, West Virginia, United States. Warden Lake is located within the Warden Lake Wildlife Management Area nestled between Baker Mountain (2,024 ft/617 m) and Big Ridge (1,995 ft/608 m).

References

Bodies of water of Hardy County, West Virginia
Reservoirs in West Virginia
Potomac River watershed
Chesapeake Bay watershed